The 70th Regiment, Illinois Volunteer Infantry, was an infantry regiment that served in the Union Army during the American Civil War.

Service
The 70th Regiment was organized at Camp Butler, Illinois and mustered into Federal service on July 4, 1862, for a term of three months. The regiment was assigned to Camp Butler, where it guarded prisoners, and mustered out on October 23, 1862.

Total strength and casualties
The 70th Regiment suffered 19 enlisted men who died of disease, for a total of 19 fatalities.

Commanders
Colonel Owen T. Reeves - mustered out with the regiment.

See also
List of Illinois Civil War Units
Illinois in the American Civil War

Notes

References
The Civil War Archive

Units and formations of the Union Army from Illinois
1862 establishments in Illinois
Military units and formations established in 1862
Military units and formations disestablished in 1862